Gulella mayottensis was a species of very small air-breathing land snail, a terrestrial pulmonate gastropod mollusk in the family Streptaxidae. This species was endemic to Mayotte.

References

mayottensis
Taxonomy articles created by Polbot
Endemic fauna of Mayotte